The electric blue kande (Sciaenochromis psammophilus) is a species of cichlid fish endemic to Lake Malawi where it prefers waters with a sandy substrate at depths of from .  It can reach a length of  SL.

References

Fish of Malawi
psammophilus
Fish described in 1993
Taxonomy articles created by Polbot
Fish of Lake Malawi